Monilea lifuana is a species of sea snail, a marine gastropod mollusk in the family Trochidae, the top snails.

Description
The height of the shell attains 11 mm, its diameter 14 mm. The rather thin, perforate shell has a conoid-depressed shape. Its; coloris  very variable, whitish-buff or rosy, brown reddish, ornamented with rosy maculations and narrow spiral lines articulated with white. Transversely it is delicately sulcate, the sulci exquisitely decussated by incremental striae. The six whorls are slightly convex, the first buff, the remainder subangulate. The body whorl is dilated, slightly subangular in the middle, convex beneath and very finely decussated. The aperture is subovate and delicately sulcate within . The columella is arcuate. The thick columellar callus is semicircular, yellowish or livid-green, almost covering the umbilicus.

Distribution
This species occurs in the Indian Ocean off Lifou, Loyalty Islands.

References

 Herbert D.G. (1996) A critical review of the trochoidean types in the Muséum d'Histoire naturelle, Bordeaux (Mollusca, Gastropoda). Bulletin du Muséum national d'Histoire naturelle, Paris, ser. 4, 18 (A, 3-4): 409-445.

External links
 To World Register of Marine Species
 

lifuana
Gastropods described in 1878